Kinesin ATP phosphohydrolase may refer to:
 Plus-end-directed kinesin ATPase, an enzyme
 Minus-end-directed kinesin ATPase, an enzyme